Nova Maiachka is an urban-type settlement in Kherson Raion, Kherson Oblast, southern Ukraine. Nova Maiachka belongs to Yuvileine rural hromada, one of the hromadas of Ukraine. It has a population of

Administrative status 
Until 18 July, 2020, Nova Maiachka belonged to Oleshky Raion. The raion was abolished in July 2020 as part of the administrative reform of Ukraine, which reduced the number of raions of Kherson Oblast to five. The area of Oleshky Raion was merged into Kherson Raion.

Economy

Transportation
The settlement has access to Highway M14, connecting Kherson with Mariupol via Melitopol.

See also 

 Russian occupation of Kherson Oblast

References

Urban-type settlements in Kherson Raion